Schizoparme straminea is a plant pathogen infecting strawberries.

References

External links 
 Index Fungorum
 USDA ARS Fungal Database

Diaporthales
Fungal strawberry diseases
Fungi described in 1923